Oughterard is a small town on the banks of the Owenriff River close to the western shore of Lough Corrib in Connemara, County Galway, Ireland. The population of the town in 2016 was 1,318. Oughterard is the chief angling centre on Lough Corrib.

Places of interest
Three kilometres outside the town stand the ruins of Aughnanure Castle, a well-preserved example of a medieval tower house. Much of the surrounding area was occupied by the O'Flaherty clan, but was taken over by Walter de Burgh, 1st Earl of Ulster, in 1256. Ross Castle is also located a number of kilometres outside Oughterard. The mansion, which is visible today, was built by the Martin family in the 17th century but there is some evidence still present of the original castle structure, built in the 15th century by the O'Flaherty family, in its foundation.

The 'Quiet Man Bridge' is located 8 kilometres past Oughterard, down the Leam Road, which was the setting for the 1950s film The Quiet Man starring John Wayne and Maureen O'Hara.

Also close to Oughterard, the Glengowla Mines (abandoned in 1865) is a "show mine" with exhibits on the lead and silver mining history of the area.

Transport
Oughterard railway station was opened by the Midland Great Western Railway on 1 January 1895, as part of its line from Galway to Clifden. The station, and the line, were closed by the Great Southern Railways on 29 April 1935.

There are daily buses going from and to Galway and Clifden along the N59. City Link and Bus Éireann are the two bus services that travel to and from Galway.

Amenities
Oughterard has a primary school, 'Scoil Chuimín agus Caitríona', and a co-educational voluntary secondary school, St Paul's. Oughterard also has a public library, which is based in the town's old courthouse, as well as a community centre with a public gymnasium.

Events 
Oughterard hosts a fishing festival every year in early May. The festival lasts for four days and includes fishing events, art exhibitions and concerts.

Sport
The local Gaelic Athletic Association club, Oughterard GAA, won the All-Ireland Intermediate Club Football Championship in 2020. 

Oughterard Golf Club, located outside the town, was incorporated in 1969 and developed in the early 1970s. It consists of an 18 hole championship course with a club house, pro-shop and restaurant.

People
Tom Collins, filmmaker based in Oughterard
John Purcell, soldier and recipient of the Victoria Cross, was born in Kilcommonn near Oughterard
Joe Shaughnessy, a professional footballer with Southend United F.C., was born in Oughterard
Matthew Tierney, Gaelic footballer, part of the Galway county football team.

See also
List of towns in the Republic of Ireland

References

External links

Discover Oughterard
Oughterard Tourism
Oughterard Heritage Site

Towns and villages in County Galway